Edith Head (October 28, 1897 – October 24, 1981) was an American costume designer who won a record eight Academy Awards for Best Costume Design between 1949 and 1973, making her the most awarded woman in the Academy's history. Head is considered to be one of the greatest and most influential costume designers in film history.

Born and raised in California, Head started her career as a Spanish teacher, but was interested in design. After studying at the Chouinard Art Institute in Los Angeles, Head was hired as a costume sketch artist at Paramount Pictures in 1923. She won acclaim for her design of Dorothy Lamour’s trademark sarong in the 1936 film The Jungle Princess, and became a household name after the Academy Award for Best Costume Design was created in 1948. Head was considered exceptional for her close working relationships with her subjects, with whom she consulted extensively; these included virtually every top female star in Hollywood.

Head worked at Paramount for 44 years. In 1967, the company declined to renew her contract, and she was invited by Alfred Hitchcock to join Universal Pictures. There she earned her eighth and final Academy Award for her work on The Sting in 1973.

Early life and career
She was born Edith Claire Posener in San Bernardino, California, the daughter of Jewish parents, Max Posener and Anna E. Levy. Her father, born in January 1858, was a naturalized American citizen from Germany, who came to the United States in 1876. Her mother was born in St. Louis, Missouri in 1875, the daughter of an Austrian father and a Bavarian mother. Max and Anna married in 1895, according to the 1900 United States Federal Census records. Just before Edith's birth, Max Posener opened a small haberdashery in San Bernardino, which failed within a year.

The marriage did not survive. In 1905, Anna remarried, this time to mining engineer Frank Spare, originally from Pennsylvania. The family moved frequently as Spare's jobs moved.  The only place Head could later recall living during her early years was Searchlight, Nevada. Frank and Anna Spare passed Edith off as their child. As Frank Spare was a Catholic, Edith ostensibly became one as well.

In 1919, Edith received a Bachelor of Arts degree in letters and sciences with honors in French from the University of California, Berkeley, and in 1920 earned a Master of Arts degree in romance languages from Stanford University.

She became a language teacher with her first position as a replacement at Bishop's School in La Jolla teaching French. After one year, she took a position teaching Spanish at the Hollywood School for Girls. Wanting a slightly higher salary, she told the school that she could also teach art, even though she had only briefly studied the discipline in high school. To improve her drawing skills, at this point rudimentary, she took evening classes at the Otis Art Institute and Chouinard Art College.

On July 25, 1923, she married Charles Head, the brother of one of her Chouinard classmates, Betty Head. Although the marriage ended in divorce in 1938 after a number of years of separation, she continued to be known professionally as Edith Head until her death. In 1940 she married award-winning art director Wiard Ihnen, a marriage which lasted until his death in 1979.

The Paramount years

In 1924, despite lacking art, design, and costume design experience, the 26-year-old Head was hired as a costume sketch artist at Paramount Pictures. Later she admitted to "borrowing" other students' sketches for her job interview. She began designing costumes for silent films, commencing with The Wanderer in 1925 and, by the 1930s, had established herself as one of Hollywood's leading costume designers. She worked at Paramount for 43 years until she went to Universal Pictures on March 27, 1967, possibly prompted by her extensive work for director Alfred Hitchcock, who had moved to Universal in 1960.

Head's marriage to set designer Wiard Ihnen, on September 8, 1940, lasted until his death from prostate cancer in 1979. Over the course of her long career, she was nominated for 35 Academy Awards, annually from 1949 (the first year that the Oscar for Best Costume Design was awarded) through 1966, and won eight times – receiving more Oscars than any other person.

Although Head was featured in studio publicity from the mid-1920s, she was originally overshadowed by Paramount's lead designers, first Howard Greer, then Travis Banton. Head was instrumental in conspiring against Banton, and after his resignation in 1938 she became a high-profile designer in her own right. Her association with the "sarong" dress designed for Dorothy Lamour in The Hurricane (1937) made her well known among the general public, although Head was a more restrained designer than either Banton or Adrian. She gained public attention for the top mink-lined gown she created for Ginger Rogers in Lady in the Dark (1944), which caused much comment owing to the mood of wartime austerity. The establishment, in 1949, of the Academy Award for Costume Design further boosted her career, giving her a record-breaking run of Award nominations and wins, beginning with her nomination for The Emperor Waltz. Head and other film designers like Adrian became well known to the public.

Head was known for her unique working style and, unlike many of her male contemporaries, usually consulted extensively with the female stars with whom she worked. As a result, she was a favorite among many of the leading female stars of the 1940s and 1950s, such as Ginger Rogers, Bette Davis, Barbara Stanwyck, Shirley MacLaine, Grace Kelly, Audrey Hepburn, and Elizabeth Taylor. In fact, Head was frequently "loaned out" by Paramount to other studios at the request of their female stars. She herself always dressed very plainly, preferring thick-framed glasses and conservative two-piece suits.

In 1946, Head worked for the first time with director Alfred Hitchcock. They worked together on his spy film Notorious. Head, who worked for Paramount, was loaned to Radio-Keith-Orpheum (RKO) pictures to work with Hitchcock on this film. In this time period it was more often found that costume designers would design to reflect their own style. Head had a different outlook on this. She felt that it was more important to design pieces that reflected the character. During their time working on this movie, Head and Hitchcock found that they were like-minded and had the same bluntness in their careers and attitudes. The costumes she designed for this film reflected restraint and the need to blend in. This style suited what Hitchcock was looking for since he did not want the clothes to be the focal point. The two would go on to work together many more times.

On February 3, 1955 (Season 5 Episode 21), Edith Head appeared as a contestant on the Groucho Marx quiz show You Bet Your Life. She and her partner won a total of $1,540.  Her winnings were donated to charity.

Head also authored two books describing her career and design philosophy, The Dress Doctor (1959) and How To Dress For Success (1967). These books were re-edited in 2008 and 2011, respectively.

The Universal years
In 1967, at the age of 70, she left Paramount Pictures and joined Universal Pictures, where she remained until her death in 1981. By this point, Hollywood was rapidly changing from what it had been during Head's heyday in the 1930s-1940s. Studio-based production was giving way to outdoors and on-scene shooting, and many of the actresses from that era whom she worked with and knew intimately had retired or were working less. She thus turned more of her attention to TV, where some old friends such as Olivia de Havilland had begun working. She designed Endora's clothing on Bewitched, and made a cameo appearance in 1973 on the detective series Columbo beside Anne Baxter, playing herself and displaying her Oscars to date. In 1974, Head received a final Oscar win for her work on The Sting.

In the late 1970s Edith Head was asked to design a woman's uniform for the United States Coast Guard, because of the increasing number of women in the Coast Guard. Head called the assignment a highlight in her career and received the Meritorious Public Service Award for her efforts. Her designs for a TV mini-series based on the novel Little Women were well received. Her last film project was the black-and-white comedy Dead Men Don't Wear Plaid (1982), starring Steve Martin and Carl Reiner, a job Head was chosen for because of her expertise on 1940s fashions. She modeled Martin and Reiner's outfits on classic film noir and the movie, released in theaters just after her death, was dedicated to her memory.

Death
Head died on October 24, 1981, four days before her 84th birthday, from myelofibrosis, an incurable bone marrow disease. She is interred at Forest Lawn Memorial Park in Glendale, California.

Hollywood Walk of Fame
Edith Head's star on the Hollywood Walk of Fame, which she received in 1974, is located at 6504 Hollywood Boulevard.

Actors and actresses designed for
Among the actresses Edith Head designed for were:

Mae West in She Done Him Wrong, 1933; Myra Breckinridge, 1970; Sextette, 1978
Frances Farmer in Rhythm on the Range, 1936, and Ebb Tide, 1937
Dorothy Lamour in The Hurricane, 1937; in most of "The Road" movies; Donovan's Reef, 1963
Paulette Goddard in The Cat and the Canary, 1939
Veronica Lake in Sullivan's Travels, 1941; I Married a Witch, 1942
Marjorie Reynolds in Holiday Inn, 1942
Barbara Stanwyck in The Lady Eve and Ball of Fire, both 1941; Double Indemnity, 1944; Christmas in Connecticut, 1945; My Reputation, 1946 The Two Mrs. Carrolls, 1947
Ginger Rogers in Lady in the Dark, 1944
Ruth Hussey, Gail Russell in The Uninvited, 1944
Ingrid Bergman in Notorious, 1946
Betty Hutton  in Incendiary Blonde, 1945; The Perils of Pauline, 1947
Loretta Young in The Farmer's Daughter, 1947
Bette Davis in June Bride, 1948; All About Eve, 1950
Olivia de Havilland in The Heiress, 1949
Hedy Lamarr and Angela Lansbury in Samson and Delilah, 1949
Gloria Swanson in Sunset Boulevard, 1950
Elizabeth Taylor in A Place in the Sun, 1951; Elephant Walk, 1954; Ash Wednesday, 1973
Joan Fontaine in Something to Live For, 1952
Carmen Miranda in Scared Stiff 1953
Audrey Hepburn in Roman Holiday, 1953; Sabrina, 1954; Funny Face, 1957; Breakfast at Tiffany's, 1961
Ann Robinson in The War of the Worlds, 1953
Grace Kelly in Rear Window, 1954; To Catch a Thief, 1955
Rosemary Clooney in White Christmas, 1954
 Jane Wyman in Lucy Gallant, 1955
Shirley MacLaine in Artists and Models, 1955; The Matchmaker, 1958; What a Way to Go!, 1964
Doris Day in The Man Who Knew Too Much, 1956
Anne Baxter in The Ten Commandments, 1956
Marlene Dietrich in Witness for the Prosecution, 1957
Lauren Bacall in Designing Woman, 1957
Rita Hayworth in Separate Tables, 1958
Kim Novak in Vertigo, 1958
Clark Gable and Doris Day in Teacher's Pet, 1958
Sophia Loren in That Kind of Woman, 1959; Heller in Pink Tights, 1960
Rhonda Fleming in Alias Jesse James, 1959
Natalie Wood in Love with the Proper Stranger, 1963; Sex and the Single Girl, 1964; Inside Daisy Clover, 1965; The Great Race, 1965; Penelope, 1966; This Property Is Condemned, 1966; The Last Married Couple in America, 1980
Tippi Hedren in The Birds, 1963; Marnie, 1964
Paula Prentiss in Man's Favorite Sport?, 1964
Christiane Schmidtmer in Ship of Fools, 1965
Julie Andrews in Torn Curtain, 1966
Jane Fonda in Barefoot in the Park, 1967
Joan Crawford in Berserk!, 1968
Claude Jade in Topaz, 1969
Katharine Hepburn in Rooster Cogburn, 1975
Jill Clayburgh in Gable and Lombard, 1976
Valerie Perrine in W.C. Fields and Me, 1976

Among the actors Edith Head designed for were:
 Fred Astaire in Holiday Inn, 1942
Danny Kaye in White Christmas, 1954
Cary Grant in To Catch a Thief, 1955
John Wayne in The Man Who Shot Liberty Valance 1962, Hatari! 1962, The Sons of Katie Elder 1965, El Dorado 1966 and Hellfighters 1968
Rock Hudson in Man's Favorite Sport?, 1964
Steve Martin in Dead Men Don't Wear Plaid, 1982
Elvis Presley in Blue Hawaii, 1961

Academy Awards
Head received eight Academy Awards for Best Costume Design, more than any other person, from a total of 35 nominations.

Guest appearances
Head made a brief appearance in Columbo: Requiem for a Falling Star (1973) acting as herself, the clothing designer for Anne Baxter's character. Her Oscars were displayed on a desk in the scene.

Again as herself, she appeared in the film Lucy Gallant (1955) as the emcee of a fashion show. She also appeared in The Pleasure of His Company (1961) as she showed dresses for Debbie Reynolds' wedding in the film, and in The Oscar (1966) in three short, non-speaking scenes opposite Elke Sommer's character, a sketch artist turned costume designer like Head herself.

Posthumous references
In 1999 the group They Might Be Giants released a song on their album, Long Tall Weekend, entitled "(She Thinks She's) Edith Head."

As part of a series of stamps issued by the U.S. Postal Service in February 2003, commemorating the behind-the-camera personnel who make movies, Head was featured on a stamp honoring costume design.

On October 28, 2013, Internet search engine Google commemorated Head's 116th birthday with a Google Doodle created by Google Artist Sophie Diao.

The one-woman play A Conversation with Edith Head premiered in Canada in 2014 at the Buddies in Bad Times Theatre, Toronto. Inspired by the book Edith Head's Hollywood, the play was by Paddy Calistro and Susan Claassen and starred and was directed by Susan Claassen. Among the key props used in the production were a size 2 dress purportedly made by Edith Head for Grace Kelly and illustrations of Head's designs. Audience members were given the opportunity of an unscripted meet and greet with Claassen while in character as Edith Head after the show.

An Edith Head costume collection from the Paramount Pictures Archive left Hollywood—for just the second time—to be shown exclusively at the Decorative Arts Center of Ohio in Lancaster in "Designing Woman: Edith Head at Paramount 1924-1967" as presented by the Fox Foundation from June 7 through August 17, 2014.

The visual appearance of Edna Mode, the costume designer in Pixar's The Incredibles and Incredibles 2, was inspired by Head in a tribute to the late designer's work in Hollywood.

A fictionalized version of Edith Head appears as one of the protagonists in the mystery novels by Renee Patrick, Design for Dying (2016), Dangerous to Know (2017), Script for Scandal (2020), The Sharpest Needle (2021), and Idle Gossip (2022).

On September 15, 2017, the advice book How To Dress For Success, written by Edith Head and Joe Hyams, was optioned by Purple Skies for a film adaptation of the life and times of Edith Head.

References

Sources

John Duka. "Edith Head, Fashion Designer for the Movies, Dies." The New York Times. October 27, 1981.

External links

 
 
 
 
 Edith Head  at Purple Skies
 Edith Head Papers at the Wisconsin Center for Film and Theater Research
 image: Edith Head alongside actress Claude Jade at the Universal-Studios 1968
 U.S. Coast Guard Historian "Women Find Favor With Coast Guard Fashion"
 Edith Head papers, Margaret Herrick Library, Academy of Motion Picture Arts and Sciences

American costume designers
Women costume designers
American fashion designers
California people in fashion
1897 births
1981 deaths
Best Costume Design Academy Award winners
California people in design
Artists from Los Angeles
American people of German-Jewish descent
Stanford University alumni
UC Berkeley College of Letters and Science alumni
Otis College of Art and Design alumni
People from Hollywood, Los Angeles
People from San Bernardino, California
People from Searchlight, Nevada
Burials at Forest Lawn Memorial Park (Glendale)
American women fashion designers
20th-century American women
20th-century American people